The Open Feu Aziz Zouhir is a tournament for professional female tennis players played on outdoor hard courts. The event is classified as a $60,000 ITF Women's World Tennis Tour tournament and is held in Monastir, Tunisia.

Past finals

Singles

Doubles

References

External links 
 2022 Open Feu Aziz Zouhir at ITFtennis.com

ITF Women's World Tennis Tour
Hard court tennis tournaments
Tennis tournaments in Tunisia